The following is a partial list of the "D" codes for Medical Subject Headings (MeSH), as defined by the United States National Library of Medicine (NLM).

This list continues the information at List of MeSH codes (D13). Codes following these are found at List of MeSH codes (D23). For other MeSH codes, see List of MeSH codes.

The source for this content is the set of 2006 MeSH Trees from the NLM.

– complex mixtures

– acid rain

– ambergris

– biological products
  – antitoxins
  – antivenins
  – diphtheria antitoxin
  – tetanus antitoxin
  – immune sera
  – antilymphocyte serum
  – menotropins
  – picibanil
  – plant preparations
  – plant extracts
  – cascara
  – curare
  – drugs, chinese herbal
  – guaiac
  – gum arabic
  – ipecac
  – karaya gum
  – pectins
  – podophyllin
  – psyllium
  – resins, plant
  – amber
  – balsams
  – propolis
  – senna extract
  – tragacanth
  – turpentine
  – plant oils
  – castor oil
  – corn oil
  – cottonseed oil
  – croton oil
  – iodized oil
  – ethiodized oil
  – linseed oil
  – safflower oil
  – sesame oil
  – soybean oil
  – Tea Tree Oil (Melaleuca Oil)
  – vaccines
  – alzheimer vaccines
  – bacterial vaccines
  – anthrax vaccines
  – brucella vaccine
  – cholera vaccines
  – diphtheria-tetanus-acellular pertussis vaccines
  – diphtheria-tetanus-pertussis vaccine
  – diphtheria-tetanus vaccine
  – escherichia coli vaccines
  – haemophilus vaccines
  – lyme disease vaccines
  – meningococcal vaccines
  – pertussis vaccine
  – diphtheria-tetanus-acellular pertussis vaccines
  – diphtheria-tetanus-pertussis vaccine
  – plague vaccine
  – rickettsial vaccines
  – salmonella vaccines
  – typhoid-paratyphoid vaccines
  – shigella vaccines
  – staphylococcal vaccines
  – streptococcal vaccines
  – pneumococcal vaccines
  – tuberculosis vaccines
  – bcg vaccine
  – cancer vaccines
  – fungal vaccines
  – protozoan vaccines
  – malaria vaccines
  – toxoids
  – diphtheria toxoid
  – diphtheria-tetanus-acellular pertussis vaccines
  – diphtheria-tetanus-pertussis vaccine
  – diphtheria-tetanus vaccine
  – staphylococcal toxoid
  – tetanus toxoid
  – diphtheria-tetanus-acellular pertussis vaccines
  – diphtheria-tetanus-pertussis vaccine
  – diphtheria-tetanus vaccine
  – vaccines, attenuated
  – vaccines, combined
  – diphtheria-tetanus-acellular pertussis vaccines
  – diphtheria-tetanus-pertussis vaccine
  – diphtheria-tetanus vaccine
  – measles-mumps-rubella vaccine
  – vaccines, contraceptive
  – vaccines, inactivated
  – poliovirus vaccine, inactivated
  – vaccines, marker
  – vaccines, subunit
  – iscoms
  – vaccines, acellular
  – diphtheria-tetanus-acellular pertussis vaccines
  – vaccines, edible
  – vaccines, synthetic
  – vaccines, conjugate
  – vaccines, dna
  – vaccines, edible
  – vaccines, virosome
  – viral vaccines
  – aids vaccines
  – cytomegalovirus vaccines
  – ebola vaccines
  – herpesvirus vaccines
  – chickenpox vaccine
  – herpes simplex virus vaccines
  – marek disease vaccines
  – influenza vaccines
  – japanese encephalitis vaccines
  – measles-mumps-rubella vaccine
  – measles vaccine
  – measles-mumps-rubella vaccine
  – mumps vaccine
  – measles-mumps-rubella vaccine
  – parainfluenza vaccines
  – poliovirus vaccines
  – poliovirus vaccine, inactivated
  – poliovirus vaccine, oral
  – pseudorabies vaccines
  – rabies vaccines
  – respiratory syncytial virus vaccines
  – rotavirus vaccines
  – rubella vaccine
  – measles-mumps-rubella vaccine
  – saids vaccines
  – smallpox vaccine
  – viral hepatitis vaccines
  – hepatitis a vaccines
  – hepatitis b vaccines
  – yellow fever vaccine

– dust

– freund's adjuvant

– manure

– plant preparations
  – plant extracts
  – cascara
  – curare
  – drugs, chinese herbal
  – guaiac
  – gum arabic
  – ipecac
  – karaya gum
  – pectins
  – podophyllin
  – psyllium
  – resins, plant
  – amber
  – balsams
  – propolis
  – senna extract
  – tragacanth
  – turpentine
  – plant oils
  – castor oil
  – clove oil
  – corn oil
  – cottonseed oil
  – croton oil
  – iodized oil
  – ethiodized oil
  – linseed oil
  – safflower oil
  – sesame oil
  – soybean oil
  – tea tree oil

– radioactive pollutants
  – air pollutants, radioactive
  – radioactive fallout
  – radioactive waste
  – soil pollutants, radioactive
  – water pollutants, radioactive

– soil
  – humic substances

– tars
  – coal tar
  – tar-water

– tissue extracts
  – actihaemyl
  – cell extracts
  – liver extracts
  – pancreatic extracts
  – pancreatin
  – pancrelipase
  – placental extracts
  – thymus extracts

– venoms
  – amphibian venoms
  – batrachotoxins
  – bombesin
  – bufotenin
  – physalaemin
  – arthropod venoms
  – ant venoms
  – bee venoms
  – apamin
  – melitten
  – scorpion venoms
  – charybdotoxin
  – spider venoms
  – omega-agatoxin iva
  – wasp venoms
  – cnidarian venoms
  – fish venoms
  – mollusk venoms
  – conotoxins
  – omega-conotoxins
  – omega-conotoxin gvia
  – eledoisin
  – snake venoms
  – elapid venoms
  – bungarotoxins
  – cobra venoms
  – cobra neurotoxins
  – direct lytic factors
  – hydrophid venoms
  – erabutoxins
  – viper venoms
  – crotalid venoms
  – ancrod
  – batroxobin
  – crotoxin

– waste products
  – hazardous waste
  – radioactive waste
  – industrial waste
  – medical waste
  – dental waste
  – medical waste disposal
  – sewage

The list continues at List of MeSH codes (D23).

D20